The women's team competition at the 2014 Asian Games in Incheon, South Korea was held from 25 September to 28 September at the Dream Park Country Club.

Schedule
All times are Korea Standard Time (UTC+09:00)

Results

References

Results

External links
Official website

Golf at the 2014 Asian Games
2014 in women's golf